The Donation Land Claim Act of 1850, sometimes known as the Donation Land Act, was a statute enacted by the United States Congress in late 1850, intended to promote homestead settlements in the Oregon Territory. It followed the Distribution-Preemption Act 1841. The law, a forerunner of the later Homestead Act, brought thousands of settlers into the new territory, swelling their ranks along the Oregon Trail. 7,437 land patents were issued under the law, which expired in late 1855. The Donation Land Claim Act allowed white men or partial Native Americans (mixed with white) who had arrived in Oregon before 1850 to work on a piece of land for four years and legally claim the land for themselves.

Along with other US land grant legislation, the Donation Land Claim Act discriminated against nonwhite settlers and had the effect of dispossessing land from Native Americans.

History
The passage of the law was largely due to the efforts of Samuel R. Thurston, the Oregon territorial delegate to Congress. In the case of a married couple, the husband and wife each owned half of the total grant under their own names. The law was one of the first that allowed married women in the United States to hold property under their own name. American "half-breed Indians" were also eligible for the grant. A provision in the law granted half the amount to those who arrived after the 1850 deadline but before 1854. Claimants were required to live on the land and to cultivate it for four years to gain ownership title to it.

Limitations
The provisional government formed at Champoeg had limited the land claims offered in the hope of preventing land speculation. The Organic Act of the Oregon Territory had granted 640 acres (2.6 km²) to each married couple. The new law voided the previous statutes but essentially continued the same policy and was worded in such a way as to legitimize existing claims. One such claim legitimized by the act was that of George Abernethy, who had been elected to the governorship in the days of the provisional government. His claim became famous for Abernethy Green, where new emigrants camped at the end of the Oregon Trail while seeking a piece of land for themselves.

Details
Claims under the law were granted at the federal land office in Oregon City. The most famous patent granted at the Oregon City Land Office was the plat for the city of San Francisco, which had to be sent up the coast from California by ship. The claims of the land were surveyed by the Surveyor General of Oregon, an office created out of the law. As part of the general survey, the Willamette Stone was placed just west of Portland, defining the Willamette Meridian.

Last year and aftermath
After the 1855 cut-off date, the designated land in Oregon was no longer free but was still available, selling at $1.25 an acre ($3.09/hectare), with a limit of 320 acres (1.3 km²) in any one claim. The law expired on December 1, 1855. In the following years, the price was raised and the maximum size of claims was progressively lowered. The government's only goal was to raise the population in that area.

In 1862, Congress passed the first of the "Homestead Acts", which was largely designed to encourage settlement of the Great Plains states, but applied to Oregon as well.

See also
 Willamette Valley
 Rogue Valley

References

External links
 Text of the act
 Bureau of Land Management: Land Office History

1850 in American law
Oregon Trail
United States federal public land legislation
1850 in American politics
31st United States Congress
Agriculture in Oregon
Aboriginal title in the United States
Settlement schemes in the United States